Diocese of Orange may refer to:

Roman Catholic Diocese of Orange in California
Ancient Diocese of Orange, in France